Srish Pal (approx. 1887 – 13 April 1939)  was a Bengali revolutionary, born in Mulbarga, Dacca, British India. His full name was Shrish Chandra Pal. He was attracted to revolutionary politics in 1905 with the guidance of Hemchandra Ghosh. He joined the Dhaka-based Mukti Sangha (later known as Bengal Volunteers). Pal was a follower of Netaji Subhas Chandra Bose.

Nandalal murder 
After the arrest and death of Prafulla Chaki, the senior revolutionary leaders decided to assassinate Nandalal Banerjee, the infamous police inspector responsible for Prafulla's arrest. Pal, along with Ranen Ganguly, a member of Atmonnati Samiti, succeed in the mission. They killed Nandalal on November 9, 1908 in Serpentine Lane, Kolkata and fled.

Rodda arms robbery 
Shrish Pal took active participation in the Rodda company arms heist case. On 26 August 1914, a group of Bengali revolutionaries stole many Mauser pistols and cartridges from the Kidderpore Dock area. The whole operation was led by Shrish Chandra Mitra, alias Habu. Pal, Khagendra Nath Das, and Haridas Dutta kept the arms safe place in a hilarious way. Finally, the police arrested Shrish Pal in 1916 but could not prove his involvement in the Nandalal murder case. He was released from jail in 1919 due to severe illness.

Death 
Shrish Pal died on 13 April 1939.

References 

1880s births
1939 deaths
Indian revolutionaries
Prisoners and detainees of British India
Revolutionary movement for Indian independence
Indian people convicted of murder
Indian independence activists from West Bengal